Trigonopterus empat is a species of flightless weevil in the genus Trigonopterus from Indonesia.

Etymology
The specific name is derived from the Indonesian word for "four".

Description
Individuals measure 2.18–2.24 mm in length.  Body is slightly oval in shape.  General coloration is dark rust-colored to black, with rust-colored tarsi and antennae and bronze tinted elytra.

Range

Phylogeny
T. empat is part of the T. saltator species group.

References

empat
Beetles described in 2014
Beetles of Asia
Insects of Indonesia